Hacıəkbərli (also, Gadzhyakperli) is a village in the Goygol Rayon of Azerbaijan.

References 

Populated places in Goygol District